Stepan Mamchich (in , Crimea, RSFSR —  in Simferopol, Crimea, UkSSR), was a Crimean painter, seascape painter.

Biography
Since 1945 Stepan Mamchich worked at artel «Crimean Artist», where he was copying I. Aivazovsky’s art works on order.

Stepan graduated from this college in 1951 and left to teach in Northern Caucasian village .

In 1954 Stepan moved to Simferopol where he continued to cooperate with artel «Crimean Artist» and later with Art fund of Union of artists. In 1962 under recommendation of T.Yablonska he was accepted to the USSR Union of Artists.

Works
 had a significant influence on Stepan Mamchich’s early art works («View of Feodosiya», 1948; «Feodosiya», 1948). With time realism features of this period transform into romantic realism painting of the second half of the 1950s («Sea of Azov. Geese on the Shore», 1960, NAMU).

Impressionistic and postimpressionistic influence is apparent in his 1960s art works («In Henichesk», 1961; «Yacht Club», 1961; «Fishing Harbor», 1964, SAM; «Southern Bay», 1964). Starting with the canvas «Swifts and roofs» (1965, SAM) critics start to identify the appearance of new motives in the Stepan’s art works which make him easily related to such  artists as K. Bogaevsky.

Motives of symbolism deepen in Stepan’s works of the second half of the 1960s – beginning of the 1970s, some researchers remark the distinct features of fauvism in the artistic picturesqueness of later period canvases  («Fishermen», 1967; «Old Settlement», 1968, SAM; «Old City Roofs», 1969; «Tremontan – northern wind», 1969; «Breath of History», 1973; «Fate. Mistletoe Cottonwood», 1973).

Gallery

References

Bibliography

External links

 
 

Landscape painters
People from Feodosia
Artists from Simferopol
1924 births
1974 deaths
Soviet realist painters